Burbeck may refer to:
Burbeck, California
Henry Burbeck